Nguyễn Văn Vy (16 January 1916 – 1981) was a South Vietnamese soldier who rose to the rank of lieutenant general in the Army of the Republic of Vietnam (ARVN). In addition to his military career, he served as Minister of National Defense of the Republic of Vietnam from 1967 to 1972.

Vy was born in 1916 in Hanoi. Vy after graduating from the administration school, against his father wishes, joined the French Officer military academy and served as an officer of an airborne regiment. He was a veteran of the Dien Bien Phu battle and took part in the allied landing in Korea. He originally served in the Vietnamese National Army under General Nguyễn Văn Hinh. On 1 May 1955 Vy was arrested after trying to take over the Army in the name of Emperor Bảo Đại to stop Ngô Đình Diệm from taking power fraudulently, and was forced to flee to France as an exile.

Vy returned to South Vietnam after the 1963 coup which removed Diem from power and led to his assassination. He was arrested during the January 1964 South Vietnamese coup for being a member of the military committee command staff, under General Dương Văn Minh (or "Big Minh"). It was the late President Diem and his brother Ngo Dinh Nhu who want to open talks with the North Vietnamese. Like most of the military leaders involved in the alleged plot, he was soon released. He rose to the rank of Lieutenant General, and was appointed Chief of Staff of the Army of the Republic of Vietnam in 1967.

In February 1967 Prime Minister Nguyễn Cao Kỳ appointed him and the Defense Minister, General Cao Văn Viên, to a committee to root out corruption among senior military personnel. President Nguyễn Văn Thiệu replaced Viên as Defense Minister with Vy on 25 May 1968. As Defense Minister, Vy ran the Servicemen's Mutual Aid and Savings Fund (SMASF), a government-run and owned pension fund for South Vietnamese military personnel.

In 1971 Vy allegedly embezzled millions of dollars from the fund in order to create or buy the Bank of Industry and Commerce, Vicco (a road and bridge construction company), Vi-navatco (a transportation firm), Icico (an insurance company), and Foproco (a food processing company). On 22 March Thiệu dismissed five of Vy's senior aides due to a scandal relating to the SMASF. Thiệu removed him from office on 6 August 1972. He was placed under house arrest, and fired in March 1974. He died in the Bégin Military Teaching Hospital in 1981 at the age of 65.

References

External links
 Photo of General Nguyễn Văn Vy at arrest

1916 births
1981 deaths
Vietnamese people of the Vietnam War
Vietnamese military personnel
Vietnamese exiles
Vietnamese emigrants to France